Pontypridd Urban District Council was a local authority in Glamorgan, Wales. It was created in 1894 as a result of the 1894 Local Government of England and Wales Act. The Council existed until 1973 and replaced the Pontypridd Local Board of Health which had functioned for some years. Its boundaries were set in 1894. Initially, the Council had eighteen members but this number was increased in the 1930s, as a result of the increase in population. There were initially six wards, namely Cilfynydd, Graig, Pontypridd Town, Rhondda, Trallwn and Treforest; a seventh ward, Rhydyfelin, was added in the 1930s.

The first councillors were elected at the December 1894 elections. Most of the first members of the authority had served on the Local Board.

In the years leading up to the First World War, representatives of the Labour Party began to gain ground.

In 1974 the authority was abolished, and together with the former rural district of Llantrisant and some outlying areas, formed the Taff Ely Borough Council which, in turn, was subsumed into the unitary authority of Rhondda Cynon Taff in 1996.

Pontypridd Urban District Council, Chairpersons 

 James F. Roberts, 1895-1898
 Patrick Gowan, 1898-1899
 R. T. Richards, 1899-1900
 Hugh Bramwell, 1900-1901
 Hopkin Morgan, 1901-1902
 Frederick George Edwards, 1902-1903
 William Lewis, 1903-1904
 William Howell Gronow, 1904-1905
 Edward Williams, 1906-1907
 David Evans, 1908-1909
 Moses Jones, 1909-1910
 David Williams, 1910-1911
 D. R. Evans, 1912-1913
 Hopkin Morgan, 1914-1915
David Jenkins, 1915-1916
 William Phillips, 1917-1918
David Lewis Davies, 1918-1919
Arthur Seaton, 1920-1921
David Williams, 1921-1922
Moses Jones, 1922-1923
Thomas Taylor, 1923-1924
W. J. Davies, 1924-1925
 David Lewis Davies, 1925-1926
(Rev) D. G. Hughes, 1927-1928
Dan Evans, 1928-1929
Evan Morgan, 1929-1930
 Robert Roper, 1931-1932
 Artemus Seymour, 1933-1934
George Paget, 1934-1935
 William Jones, 1935-1936
Jack Jones, 1936-1937
 Arthur Pearson, 1937-1938
 Walter Collier, 1938-1939
 F. Morgan Phillips, 1939-1940
 Jesse Powderhill, 1940-1941
 Evan Morgan, 1941-1942
 Edwin Rowbotham, 1942-1943
 C. H. James, 1943-1945
 Hopkin Smith, 1945-1946
 H. Gardner, 1946-1947
 George Paget, 1947-1948
 David J. Richards, 1948-1949
 H. G. Joshua, 1949-1950
 Blodwen Randall, 1950-1951
 Arthur R. Watkins, 1951-1952
 H. G. A. Darke, 1952-1953
 Arthur Brown, 1953-1954
 John Stallard, 1954-1955
 J. R. Clayton, 1955-1956
 D. G. Ball, 1956-1957
 S. Jones, 1957-1958
 Llewellyn Hopkin, 1958-1959
 J. Howell Davies, 1959-1960
 F. J. C. Warner, 1960-1961
 Emrys W. Peck. 1961-1962
 A. W. B. Higgins, 1962-1963
 Gwladys May Williams, 1963-1964
 J. Ll. Williams, 1964-1965
 Richard Evans, 1965-1966
 Norman J. Randell, 1966-1967
 John Davies, 1967-1968
 William John Cheesman, 1968-1969
 J. C. Anzani, 1969-1970
 Reginald Price, 1970-1971
 Mary G. Murphy, 1971-1972
 G. H. Paget, 1972-1973

Pontypridd Urban District council election, 1894
The first election to Pontypridd Urban District Council was held in December 1894. Three councillors were elected in each ward.

(**) indicates previous membership of the Local Board of Health.

After the election, the initial composition of the council was as follows.

Cilfynydd Ward

Graig

Rhondda Ward

Town Ward

Trallwn Ward

Treforest Ward

Pontypridd Urban District council by-election, 1895 
Although no elections to Pontypridd Urban District council were scheduled for 1895, the first full year of the council's existence, the death of William Williams created a vacancy in the Town Ward.  There was no change to the overall composition of the council, following the by-election held on 13 May 1895.

Pontypridd Urban District council election, 1896 
In the Pontypridd Urban District Council election of 1896 there were contests in three of the six wards.

(*) denotes sitting member

Cilfynydd Ward

Graig Ward

Rhondda Ward

Town Ward
William Seaton, elected the previous year, stood down after the council resolved that he, rather than another member elected in a by-election during the year, should seek re-election.

Trallwn Ward

Treforest Ward

Pontypridd Urban District council by-election, 1896 
A by-election was held in Cilfynydd at the end of April 1896 to fill the vacancy left by the departure of Thomas Williams.

Pontypridd Urban District council election, 1897 
In the Pontypridd Urban District Council election of 1897 there were contests in three of the six wards.

(*) denotes sitting member

Cilfynydd Ward

Graig Ward

Rhondda Ward

Town Ward

Trallwn Ward

Treforest Ward

Pontypridd Urban District council election, 1898
In the Pontypridd Urban District Council election of 1898 there were contests in three of the six wards.

(*) denotes sitting member

Cilfynydd Ward

Graig Ward

Rhondda Ward

Town Ward

Trallwn Ward

Treforest Ward

Pontypridd Urban District council election, 1899
In the Pontypridd Urban District Council election of 1899 there were contests in two of the six wards.

(*) denotes sitting member

Cilfynydd Ward

Graig Ward

Rhondda Ward

Town Ward

Trallwn Ward

Treforest Ward

Pontypridd Urban District council election, 1900
In the Pontypridd Urban District Council election of 1900 there were contests in four of the six wards.

(*) denotes sitting member

Cilfynydd Ward

Graig Ward

Rhondda Ward

Town Ward

Trallwn Ward

Treforest Ward

Pontypridd Urban District council election, 1901 
In the Pontypridd Urban District Council election of 1901 there were contests in four of the six wards.

(*) denotes sitting member

Cilfynydd Ward

Graig

Rhondda Ward

Town Ward

Trallwn Ward

Treforest Ward

Pontypridd Urban District council election, 1902 
In the Pontypridd Urban District Council election of 1902 there were contests in two of the six wards.

(*) denotes sitting member

Cilfynydd Ward

Graig

Rhondda Ward

Town Ward

Trallwn Ward

Treforest Ward

Pontypridd Urban District council election, 1903 
In the Pontypridd Urban District Council election of 1903 there were contests in three of the six wards.

(*) denotes sitting member

Cilfynydd Ward

Graig Ward

Rhondda Ward

Town Ward

Trallwn Ward

Treforest Ward

Pontypridd Urban District council by-election, 1903 
A by-election was held in the Town ward in May 1903 to fill the vacancy left by the resignation of Arthur Seaton.

Pontypridd Urban District council election, 1904 
In the Pontypridd Urban District Council election of 1904 there were contests in three of the six wards.

(*) denotes sitting member

Cilfynydd Ward

Graig Ward

Rhondda Ward

Town Ward

Trallwn Ward

Treforest Ward

Pontypridd Urban District council election, 1905 
In the Pontypridd Urban District Council election of 1905 there was a contest in only one of the six wards.

(*) denotes sitting member

Cilfynydd Ward

Graig Ward

Rhondda Ward

Town Ward 

Note: Jones's potential opponent, H. E. Crane, dropped out of the race before election day.

Trallwn Ward

Treforest Ward

Pontypridd Urban District council election, 1906 
In the Pontypridd Urban District Council election of 1906 there were contests in three of the six wards.

(*) denotes sitting member

Cilfynydd Ward

Graig Ward

Rhondda Ward

Town Ward

Trallwn Ward

Treforest Ward

Pontypridd Urban District council election, 1907 
In the Pontypridd Urban District Council election of 1907 there were contests in four of the six wards.

(*) denotes sitting member

Cilfynydd Ward

Graig Ward

Rhondda Ward

Town Ward

Trallwn Ward

Treforest Ward

Pontypridd Urban District council election, 1908 
In the Pontypridd Urban District Council election of 1908 there were contests in three of the six wards, most notably in Cilfynydd - the first contested election there since the by-election in 1896.

(*) denotes sitting member

Cilfynydd Ward

Graig Ward

Rhondda Ward

Town Ward

Trallwn Ward

Treforest Ward

Notable members of the Council

Walter Morgan, solicitor
Arthur Pearson, Member of Parliament.
David Lewis Davies, Member of Parliament

References

Bibliography

Urban district councils of Wales
Politics of Glamorgan
Pontypridd